Coltman is a surname, and may refer to:

 Bob Coltman (born 1937), American singer
 Constance Coltman (1889–1969), English congregational minister
 Sir Leycester Coltman (1938–2003), British ambassador
 Liam Coltman (born 1990), New Zealand rugby union player
 Robert Coltman (1862–1931), American physician 
 William Coltman (1891–1974), English recipient of the Victoria Cross